Robert Harry Wood (January 14, 1916 – October 22, 1973) was an American football offensive tackle/defensive tackle in the National Football League who played for the Chicago Cardinals and the Green Bay Packers.  Wood played collegiate ball for the University of Alabama before being drafted by the Cleveland Rams in the 4th round of the 1940 NFL Draft. Selected to play in the Pro Bowl and First-team All-Pro. He played professionally for 1 season, in 1940. He left his professional football career to serve in WWII alongside his three brothers.

References

1916 births
1973 deaths
People from McComb, Mississippi
Players of American football from Mississippi
Alabama Crimson Tide football players
Chicago Cardinals players
Green Bay Packers players